Rockdale Community Church is a historic church on New York State Route 8 in the hamlet of Rockdale, Chenango County, New York. It was built in 1860 and is a one-story rectangular wood-frame building, three bays long and three bays wide.  It sits on a stone foundation and is surmounted by a gable roof.  It features a two-stage tower topped by a small cross.

It was added to the National Register of Historic Places in 2005.

References

Churches on the National Register of Historic Places in New York (state)
Churches completed in 1860
Churches in Chenango County, New York
National Register of Historic Places in Chenango County, New York